Franklin Dale Robbins (September 4, 1922 - September 6, 2012) was an American tennis player.  He reached a career high ranking of 182 and appeared at the 1969 US Open.

References

American male tennis players
Tennis people from Utah
1922 births
2012 deaths